Andy Bobrow is an American television writer and producer known for his work on Community.  He was previously a writer for Malcolm in the Middle, head writer for The Last Man on Earth, Brooklyn Nine-Nine, Bless the Harts and created a mockumentary called The Old Negro Space Program.  He currently voices Owly on the Love Me Cat Show.

Early life and career
Bobrow attended Berkley High School in Berkley, Michigan, and Michigan State University. He plays the tuba and majored in music. He was a copywriter at several advertising agencies in Detroit and Los Angeles, including Campbell-Ewald and Ketchum. Bobrow also performed in the Groundlings Theater Sunday Company. It was there that Bobrow made several significant connections, including Will Forte, who introduced Bobrow to his agent at UTA, and Jordan Black, who recommended Bobrow for his first TV writing job, on the short-lived sketch comedy show Hype on the WB Network.

Bobrow wrote the second episode of the Fox comedy, The Last Man on Earth, which was first aired as the second half of the series premiere, March 1, 2015.

Andy Bobrow was also a writer, showrunner, and executive producer on Fox's Bless the Harts.

References

External links

 

American television writers
American male television writers
Living people
Year of birth missing (living people)